Omar Diallo (born September 28, 1972 in Dakar) is a Senegalese former professional footballer who played as a goalkeeper. He played for a few clubs, including Olympique Khouribga in Morocco and Sakaryaspor in Turkey. He played for the Senegal national team and was a participant at the 2002 FIFA World Cup.

External links
 
 
 Omar Diallo brille dans les navétanes : un tremplin pour une seconde jeunesse at au-senegal.com

1972 births
Living people
Senegalese footballers
Senegal international footballers
Association football goalkeepers
ASC Jaraaf players
Raja CA players
Olympique Club de Khouribga players
Sakaryaspor footballers
Süper Lig players
Footballers from Dakar
2002 FIFA World Cup players
2000 African Cup of Nations players
2002 African Cup of Nations players
2004 African Cup of Nations players
Senegalese expatriate footballers
Senegalese expatriate sportspeople in Turkey
Senegalese expatriate sportspeople in Morocco
Expatriate footballers in Morocco